Mariusz Fyrstenberg and Marcin Matkowski were the defending champions but lost in the second round to Alexander Peya and Bruno Soares.
Bob and Mike Bryan won the title, defeating Peya and Soares in the final, 6–2, 6–3.

Seeds
All seeds receive a bye into the second round.

Draw

Finals

Top half

Bottom half

References
 Main draw

Men's doubles